Neosomatidia bipustulata is a species of beetle in the family Cerambycidae, and the only species in the genus Neosomatidia. It was described by Stephan von Breuning in 1978.

See also
Longhorn Beetles
Catalogue of Life

References

External links
Longhorn Beetles

Parmenini
Beetles described in 1978